Bheri Zone was one of the fourteen zones located in the Mid-Western Development Region of Nepal. Nepalgunj were the administrative headquarters.

Cities and towns were Narayan, Jajarkot and Chhinchu in the "hills"; Nepalgunj, Gularia and Kohalpur in Terai; and Birendranagar in Surkhet Valley in the Inner Terai.

Administrative subdivisions
Bheri was divided into five districts; since 2015 the three northern districts have been redesignated as part of Karnali Province, while the two southern districts have been redesignated as part of Lumbini Province.

See also
 Development Regions of Nepal (Former)
 List of zones of Nepal (Former)
 List of districts of Nepal

 
Zones of Nepal
Karnali Province
Lumbini Province
2015 disestablishments in Nepal